Louisa may refer to:

Places
Australia
 Louisa Island (Tasmania)

Canada
 Louisa or Lac-Louisa, a community in Wentworth, Quebec

Malaysia
 Louisa Reef, Sabah

United States
 Louisa, Kentucky
 Louisa, Missouri
 Louisa, Virginia
 Louisa County, Iowa
 Louisa County, Virginia

Belgium

 Louisa - Square in Brussels and metro station, next to Palace de Justice, see Avenue Louise

Other
 HMS Louisa, the name of four ships of the Royal Navy
 Louisa (ship), United States ship of the 1800s
 Louisa (film), 1950 film starring Ronald Reagan

People with the given name
Louisa of Great Britain (1749–1768)
Louisa, Countess of Craven, originally Louisa Brunton (1785?–1860), English actress
Louisa (singer) (born Louisa Johnson, 1998), English singer
Louisa Adams (1775–1852), First Lady of the United States from 1825 to 1829
Louisa May Alcott (1832–1888), American novelist, short story writer and poet
Louisa Rose Allen, English singer and songwriter known as Foxes
Louisa Beaufort (1781–1863), Irish antiquarian, author and artist
Louisa Dow Benton (1831–1895), American linguist and letter writer
Louisa Bertman, Jewish American illustrator, animator, visual narrative artist specializing in social and political advocacy
Louisa Burns (c.1869–1958), American osteopathic physician
Louisa Cavendish, Duchess of Devonshire
Louisa Cavendish-Bentinck (1832–1918) 
Louisa Chafee (born 1991), American competitive sailor
Louisa Clein (born 1979), English actress
Lady Louisa Conolly (1743–1821), Irish noblewoman
Louisa Knapp Curtis (1851–1910), Columnist and first editor of the Ladies Home Journal
Louisa Emily Dobrée (fl. ca. 1877–1917), French writer
Louisa Lane Drew (1820–1897), English-born American actress
Louisa Durrell (1886–1964)
Louisa Frederici (1844–1921)
Louisa Morton Greene, American social reformer
Louisa Gould, Jewish activist
Louisa Harland, Irish actress
Louisa Horton (1920–2008), American film, television, and stage actress
Louisa Jacobson (born 1991), American actress
Louisa Jane Hall (1802–1892), American poet, essayist, literary critic 
Louisa Vesterager Jespersen (died 2018), Danish female murder victim
Louisa Johnson, English singer 
Louisa Krause (born 1986), American film, stage, and television actress
Louisa Lawson (1848–1920), Australian poet, writer, publisher, suffragist, and feminist
Louisa Lytton (born 1989), English actress and dancer
Louisa Susannah Cheves McCord (1810–1879), American writer
Louisa Moritz (1936–2019), Cuban-American actress and lawyer
Louisa Starr (1845–25 May 1909), British painter
Louisa Maria Stuart (1692–1712), Princess Royal
Louisa Swain (1801–1880)
Louisa Thomas (born 1981), American writer and sports journalist
Louisa Caroline Huggins Tuthill (1799–1879), American children's book author
Louisa Wisseling, former member of Australian folk-influenced pop quartet The Seekers
Louisa Young, British writer

Fictional characters 
Louisa Clarke, a character in the film Me Before You
Louisa Musgrove, character in Jane Austen's novel Persuasion.
Louisa is the pen name of the eighteenth century English writer Elizabeth Boyd (1710–1745)

See also
 Louis (disambiguation)
 Louise (disambiguation)
 Luisa (disambiguation)

English feminine given names